Robert Carl "Bob" Hunter (born January 14, 1944) is an American jurist, who served as a Judge of the North Carolina Court of Appeals from 1998 through 2014.

Hunter, born in Marion, North Carolina, earned a degree in political science from the University of North Carolina at Chapel Hill in 1966 before earning his Juris Doctor degree from the same institution in 1969. While at UNC-Chapel Hill, he became a brother of Alpha Phi Omega. After earning his degree, Hunter worked as a county attorney in McDowell County, North Carolina.  He also represented the 49th District in the North Carolina House of Representatives from 1980 to 1998. Significant legislation passed during his tenure included the Highway Trust Fund, NC Victims' Bill of Rights, NC Victims' Compensation Fund, and the establishment of Lake James State Park.

In 1998, Hunter was appointed by Gov. Jim Hunt to the state Court of Appeals, and he was elected to an eight-year term on the court that same year.  In 2006, Hunter won the plurality of votes in the state's non-partisan primary on May 2, thus advancing to the November general election.  Winning 99 of 100 counties, he defeated Kris Bailey in that election to win another eight-year term.  He announced in 2013 that he would retire at the end of his term rather than seek re-election in 2014. During his tenure on the Court of Appeals, Hunter decided over 4,000 appellate cases and authored over 1,500 opinions.

Hunter has been active in community and nonprofit organizations.  He is a board member of both the N.C. Healthy Start Foundation and Southmountain Children's Services, and he is a member of the Rotary Club of Raleigh, McDowell Economic Development Association, and the McDowell Chamber of Commerce.

Hunter ran for the North Carolina Supreme Court in 2002 and in 2010, losing to Robert F. Orr and to Barbara Jackson, respectively.

He is married and has two children.

See also
Robert N. Hunter, Jr., a similarly named fellow judge of the Court of Appeals

Notes

External links
 Official biography
 Campaign Website

1944 births
Living people
North Carolina Court of Appeals judges
Members of the North Carolina House of Representatives
People from Marion, North Carolina